Eduard "Edy" Havlicek (born 20 February 1912) was an Austrian footballer and football manager. His brother was Viktor Havlicek.

He spent the majority of his coaching career in Germany with Borussia Dortmund, STV Horst Emscher, Stuttgarter Kickers, Borussia Neunkirchen, FC Singen 04, TuS Eving-Lindenhorst and Union Ohligs. He also had a spell with Luxembourg and Stade Dudelange.

References

External links
 Profile at www.kickersarchiv.de

1912 births
Austrian people of Slavic descent
Austrian footballers
Footballers from Vienna
Association football goalkeepers
Austrian football managers
Austrian expatriate football managers
Borussia Dortmund managers
Luxembourg national football team managers
Stuttgarter Kickers managers
Borussia Neunkirchen managers
STV Horst-Emscher managers
Austrian expatriate sportspeople in Germany
Expatriate football managers in Germany
Austrian expatriate sportspeople in Luxembourg
Expatriate football managers in Luxembourg